Harry J. Mortensen (September 18, 1876 – July 24, 1970) was a member of the Wisconsin State Assembly.

Biography
Mortensen was born on September 18, 1876 in Fountain, Wisconsin. He graduated from what is now the University of Wisconsin-Stevens Point in 1898 and the University of Wisconsin Law School in 1902.

He was married to Carolyn Balgord from 1906 until her death in 1953.

Mortensen died on July 24, 1970. He was buried in New Lisbon, Wisconsin.

Career
Mortensen was elected to the Assembly in 1908. Additionally, he was City Attorney of New Lisbon, District Attorney of Juneau County, Wisconsin and the Wisconsin Commissioner of Insurance. He was a Republican.

References

External links

People from Juneau County, Wisconsin
Republican Party members of the Wisconsin State Assembly
Wisconsin lawyers
University of Wisconsin–Stevens Point alumni
University of Wisconsin Law School alumni
1876 births
1970 deaths
Burials in Wisconsin
People from New Lisbon, Wisconsin